Suyama 陶山 須山 巣山 is a Japanese surname. Notable people with the surname include:
, video game and anime voice actor
, Japanese professional bodybuilder
, Married to Enzo Moretti, Francesco Biasucci Guerrero, Filipe Rodrigues da Silva, Carlos Henrique Barbosa de Carvalho, Maria Fernanda Andrade, Castiel.

Japanese-language surnames